Captain D'Urban Victor Armstrong DFC was a World War I flying ace credited with five aerial victories.

Born in the Colony of Natal on 26 July 1897, and educated at Hilton College, Armstrong joined the Royal Flying Corps in 1915. He was assigned to No. 60 Squadron the following  year; while with them, he scored a kill on 9 November 1916. His next posting was to No. 44 Squadron on home defense duties. In 1917, he was transferred to No. 78 Squadron to lead a flight. His final assignment was with No. 151 Squadron.

He was one of the first night fighter victors in aerial warfare, as 151 Squadron was the Royal Air Force's first night fighter squadron, 151 Squadron. Armstrong was credited with four nighttime victories between 29 June and 17 September 1918, including a Gotha G bomber on 24 August near Bouvincourt-en-Vermandois, France. Two days after war's end, Armstrong was killed in a flying accident while flying aerobatics in his Sopwith Camel.

References

1897 births
1918 deaths
People from Natal
Recipients of the Distinguished Flying Cross (United Kingdom)
South African World War I flying aces
White South African people
South African people of British descent
Alumni of Hilton College (South Africa)
Aviators killed in aviation accidents or incidents in France
Victims of aviation accidents or incidents in 1918